Penelopognathus (meaning "wild duck jaw") is a genus of dinosaur which lived during the Early Cretaceous. It was an iguanodont ancestral to hadrosaurids, which also contributes to the hypothesis that hadrosauroids originated in Asia. Fossils have been found in the Bayin-Gobi Formation in what is now China. The type species, Penelopognathus weishampeli, named after David Weishampel, was described by Godefroit, Li, and Shang in 2005, based on fragmentary jaw fossils. 

Its jaw is similar to that of Altirhinus and Probactrosaurus, suggesting that Penelopognathus was related to the two genera. Prieto-Márquez and Carrera Farias (2021) found that Telmatosaurus was the sister taxon to Penelopognathus, which was also found to be closely related to Lophorhothon, as opposed to Tethyshadros.

References

Iguanodonts
Early Cretaceous dinosaurs of Asia
Fossil taxa described in 2005
Taxa named by Pascal Godefroit
Paleontology in Inner Mongolia
Ornithischian genera